Red5 is a free software media streaming server implemented in Java, which provides services similar to those offered by the proprietary Adobe Flash Media Server and Wowza Streaming Engine including:
 Streaming Video (FLV, F4V, MP4, 3GP)
 Streaming Audio (MP3, F4A, M4A, AAC)
 Recording Client Streams (FLV and AVC+AAC in FLV container)
 Shared Objects
 Live Stream Video Publishing (FLV, VP6)
 Live Stream Audio Publishing (MP3, AAC)
 Remoting (Action Message Format)
 Protocols: RTMP, RTMPT, RTMPS, and RTMPE

The project started in September 2005 and as of 2008 is now maintained at GitHub. Version 1.0 was released on December 3, 2012 and is available under the Apache License (version 2.0).

History 
 Project Started September 2005
 Version 0.8.0 Released 4 June 2009
 Version 1.0.0 Released 3 December 2012
 Version 1.0.1 Released 15 January 2013
 Version 1.0.2 Released 13 July 2013
 Version 1.0.3 Released 5 August 2014
 Version 1.0.4 Released 26 December 2014
 Version 1.0.5 Released 7 February 2015
 Version 1.0.6 Released 8 September 2015
 Version 1.0.7 Released 13 May 2016
 Version 1.0.8 Released 23 December 2016
 Version 1.0.9 Released 12 June 2017
 Version 1.0.10 Released 9 February 2019
 Version 1.1.0 Released 22 April 2019
 Version 1.1.1 Released 29 May 2019
 Version 1.2.2 Released 5 September 2019
 Version 1.2.3 (current version) Released 14 October 2019

See also 
 Comparison Of Streaming Media Systems

References

External links 
 

Free software programmed in Java (programming language)
Media servers
Streaming software